Georgia Wilson may refer to:
 Georgia Wilson (field hockey)
 Georgia Wilson (equestrian)
 Georgia Wilson (footballer)

See also
 Georgina Wilson, Filipino-British model, actress, host and VJ